Barh El Gazel is one of the 23 regions of Chad. The region's name may also be written as Barh El Gazal or Bahr el Gazel. Its capital is the town of Moussoro. The region was created in 2008 from the former Barh El Gazel Department of the Kanem Region.

Geography
The region borders Borkou Region to the north, Batha Region to the east, Hadjer-Lamis Region to the south, and Kanem Region to the west. The region is predominantly grassland, merging into the Sahara Desert in the north.

Settlements
Moussoro is the regional capital; other major settlements include Chadra, Dourgoulanga, Michemiré and Salal.

Demographics
As per the census of 2009, the population of the region was 260,865, 46.3% female. The average size of household as of 2009 is 5.90: 5.90 in rural households and 5.80 in urban areas. The total number of households was 43,478: 38,160 in rural areas and 5,318 in urban areas. The number of nomads in the region was 126,855, 32.7% of the population. There were 257,804 people residing in private households. There were 111,278 above 18 years of age: 56,407 male and 54,871 female. The sex ratio was 116.00 females for every 100 males. There were 134,010 sedentary staff, 1.20 of the total population.

The main ethnolinguistic groups are the Dazaga Toubou and the Kanembu.

Economy
The region is the principal agricultural segment in the whole country, producing cotton and groundnuts, the two main cashcrops of the country. There are a variety of local crops such as rice grown in the region.

Local administration

As a part of decentralization in February 2003, the country is administratively split into regions, departments, municipalities and rural communities. The prefectures which were originally 14 in number were re-designated in 17 regions. The regions are administered by Governors appointed by the President. The Prefects, who originally held the responsibility of the 14 prefects, still retained the titles and were responsible for the administration of smaller departments in each region. The members of local assemblies are elected every six years, while the executive organs are elected every three years. As of 2016, there are totally 23 regions in Chad, which are divided based on population and administrative convenience.

The region of Barh El Gazel is divided into two departments. each listed with the name of its capital or main town (chef-lieu in French) and a list of sub-prefectures (sous-préfectures).

See also
2010 Sahel famine
Sahel drought

References

External links

 
Regions of Chad